Stinatz (Croatian: Stinjaki, Hungarian: Pásztorháza) is a town in the district of Güssing in Burgenland in Austria.  According to the last census 62% of the population are members of the Burgenland Croat minority.

Geography
The town lies in the district of Guessing in the south of Burgenland and is composed of two urban districts, Stinatz and Stinatz-Nord. The neighboring towns are Ollerdorf, Hackerberg, Litzelsdorf and Wörterberg.

History
Due to the Ottoman Wars in the 15th century, many Croatian families emigrated to this area and founded their own town. Stinatz was first mentioned in a document in the year 1577. Like the whole Burgenland area, Stinatz belonged to Hungary until 1921. Due to a change in the Hungarian law and policy in 1889, the town, originally named Stinjaki, was given the Hungarian name Stinacs. The town belongs since 1921 to the new founded Burgenland.

The Croat inhabitants of Stinatz speak the Southern Chakavian dialect.

Population

Politics 
In the year 2009, the long-time mayor Alfred Grandits (SPÖ) had to retire because of serious health problems. The next election will be in January 2010. In the meantime Andreas Grandits (ÖVP) acts in place of Alfred Grandits. After the last elections the SPÖ has 10 mandate and the ÖVP has 9 mandate.  Although the town has about 1400 citizen, there are many teenagers interested in politics and therefore there are many events arranged by the Social Youth and the JVP.

Educational institutions
Due to the quantity of children, the town has its own preschool and elementary school. Although the amount of births declined during the last years, the school has enough children, because there are many immigrants in the town.

Associations and events
There are many clubs in the town like the, football club, musical society, tennis club, Stinjacko

Kolo and the Naturfreunde. All these clubs have their own events.

Folkways 
The town is characterized by its Croatian origin, in particular the colorful local costume (Stinatzer Tracht) and the huge weddings, where there is a lot of singing and dancing.

Personalities 
 Marijana Grandits, politician
 Ferdinand Grandits, politician
 Ernst A. Grandits, TV host on 3 Sat
 Thomas Resetarits, sculptor
 Lukas Resetarits, cabaret artist
 Willi Resetarits, musician, alias Kurt Ostbahn
 Terezija Stoisits, politician
 Thomas Stipsits, cabaret artist

References 

This article incorporates information from the German Wikipedia.
http://gemeinde.stinatz.at

Cities and towns in Güssing District